Tiyara is a village located in the south east corner of Azamgarh district under Lalganj tehsil. The village is governed by a gram panchayat.

References

External links
 http://wikimapia.org/#lat=25.6837673&lon=83.1714821&z=15&l=0&m=a&v=2

Villages in Azamgarh district